Martín Ariel Vitali (born 11 November 1975 in Moreno) is a former Argentine football defender

Career
Martín Vitali debuted professionally with Ferro Carril Oeste in a game against San Lorenzo in 1996. After descending with Ferro Carril Oeste, Vitali went through Independiente in season 2000-01 and, for the upcoming season, he joined Racing Club. With the Academy won the Torneo Apertura 2001 thus cutting off a streak of 35 years without national titles for the club. Vitali also played in Spain, defending the colors of the CD Leganés and Getafe CF between 2003 and 2005 until he returned to Racing for the Torneo Clausura 2005. After a long injury, returned to the first of Racing Club on April 29, 2007 in a game of the reserves, against Boca Juniors.

Honours
APOP Kinyras
 Cypriot Cup: 2008–09

References

External links
  Martín Vitali - Argentine Primera statistics at Futbol XXI  
 Martín Vitali at BDFA.com.ar 

1975 births
Living people
People from Moreno Partido
Sportspeople from Buenos Aires Province
Argentine footballers
Argentine expatriate footballers
Association football defenders
Getafe CF footballers
Nueva Chicago footballers
CD Leganés players
Racing Club de Avellaneda footballers
Club Atlético Independiente footballers
Ferro Carril Oeste footballers
APOP Kinyras FC players
La Liga players
Segunda División players
Argentine Primera División players
Cypriot First Division players
Expatriate footballers in Cyprus
Expatriate footballers in Spain
Argentine expatriate sportspeople in Spain